Itabaiana is a municipality located in the Brazilian state of Sergipe. Its population was 96,142 (2020) and its area is 336.685 km².

The municipality contains part of the Serra de Itabaiana National Park.

References

Municipalities in Sergipe